Charles Larmore (born 23 March 1950) is an American philosopher. He is the W. Duncan MacMillan Family Professor of the Humanities and Professor of Philosophy at Brown University, noted for his writings on political liberalism as well as on various topics in moral philosophy and the history of philosophy.

Education and career

Larmore received his A.B. at Harvard (1972) and his Ph.D. at Yale (1978).  He taught for many years in the philosophy department at Columbia University, and then as the Chester D. Tripp Professor and the Raymond W. & Martha Hilpert Gruner Distinguished Service Professor at the University of Chicago in philosophy and political science.

Philosophical work

He has been a defender of political liberalism along with John Rawls, as well as a contributor to moral philosophy (moral realism, the nature of the self) and to the history of philosophy from the 16th to the 20th centuries (including such figures as Montaigne, Descartes, Bayle, Kant, Hölderlin, Schopenhauer, Nietzsche, Sartre). His most recent work focuses on the nature of reason and reasons.

Prizes, awards and membership in societies 
 Grand Prix de Philosophie from the Académie française (2004) for Les Pratiques du Moi'
 Member of the American Academy of Arts and Sciences (Elected May 2005)
 Gadamer Prize (2022) 

 Selected publications 
Larmore, C. (1987) Patterns of Moral Complexity, Cambridge University Press
Larmore, C. (1993) Modernité et morale, Presses Universitaires de France
Larmore, C. (1996) The Morals of Modernity, Cambridge University Press.
Larmore, C. (1996) The Romantic Legacy, Columbia University Press
Larmore, C. (2004) Les pratiques du moi, Presses Universitaires de France (English translation: Practices of the Self, 2010, University of Chicago Press )
Larmore, C. (2004) Débat sur l'éthique. Idéalisme ou réalisme (with Alain Renaut), Grassetar
Larmore, C. (2008) The Autonomy of Morality, Cambridge University Press
Larmore, C. (2008) Dare ragioni. Il soggetto, l'etica, la politica, Rosenberg & Sellier, Torino
Larmore, C. (2009) Dernières nouvelles du moi (with Vincent Descombes), Presses Universitaires de France
Larmore, C. (2012) Vernunft und Subjektivität, Suhrkamp Verlag
Larmore, C. (2017)  Das Selbst in seinem Verhältnis zu sich und zu anderen, Klostermann Verlag (Rote Reihe)
Larmore, C. (2020) What is Political Philosophy?, Princeton University Press
Larmore, C. (2021) Morality and Metaphysics'', Cambridge University Press

References

20th-century American philosophers
American political philosophers
Brown University faculty
University of Chicago faculty
Historians of philosophy
Moral realists
Living people
1950 births
Harvard University alumni
Yale University alumni